"I Like It"  is a song recorded by American singer-songwriter Dino. It was released in 1989 as the third single from his album 24/7. The single peaked at No. 7 on the Billboard Hot 100 and No. 3 on the Hot Dance Music/Club Play chart in the United States. In Canada, it reached the top 30 of the 100 most played tracks, and reached No. 1 on the dance music chart.

Music video
The music video was directed by ? and premiered on MTV & VH-1 in 1989.

Tracks

Charts

Weekly charts

Year-end charts

Certifications

References

External links
 
 

1989 singles
1989 songs
Dino (singer) songs
Island Records singles